Cromanton is an unincorporated community (by some accounts a ghost town) in Bay County, in the U.S. state of Florida.

History
Cromanton was platted in 1888. A post office was established at Cromanton in 1888, and remained in operation until 1941. Cromanton was overtaken by Tyndall Air Force Base and little remains of the original community.

References

Unincorporated communities in Bay County, Florida
Unincorporated communities in Florida